Sarduiyeh (also Romanized as Sārdū’īyeh and Sardueeyeh; also known as Balūchestānī) is a village in Hur Rural District, in the Central District of Faryab County, Kerman Province, Iran. At the 2006 census, its population was 204, in 44 families.

References 

Populated places in Faryab County